Nordic House may refer to:

 Nordic House (Iceland), designed by Finnish architect Alvar Aalto
 Nordic House in the Faroe Islands

See also
 Pan Nordic Building